Mario Posch (born 18 July 1967) is an Austrian football coach and a former defender.

References

1967 births
Living people
Association football defenders
Austrian footballers
Austria international footballers
Austrian football managers
KFC Uerdingen 05 players
SK Sturm Graz players
Bundesliga players
First Vienna FC managers
People from Bad Radkersburg
Footballers from Styria